Tashi Peljor (born 15 July 1978) is a Bhutanese archer. Peljor is a scholarship holder with the Olympic Solidarity program.

2004 Summer Olympics
Peljor competed at the 2004 Summer Olympics in men's individual archery. Ranked as number 52, he managed to beat French Jocelyn de Grandis (ranked 13th) with 161-136. Doing so, became the lowest ranked archer to advance and even got the fourth highest score of the round. In the second round of elimination, he was defeated by Anton Prylepav.  His final rank was 32nd overall. Peljor was the first male Bhutanese archer to win a match at an Olympics, and missed becoming the first Bhutanese archer of either gender to win a match at an Olympics only because the women's matches began before the men's did.  Tshering Chhoden won her match on 15 August while Peljor's first match of the tournament was on 16 August.

2008 Summer Olympics
At the 2008 Summer Olympics in Beijing Peljor finished his ranking round with a total of 632 points. This gave him the 54th seed for the final competition bracket in which he faced Wang Cheng Pang in the first round. Wang won the game 110-100, but was eliminated in the next round by Moriya Ryuichi.

See also
 Bhutan at the Olympics

References

External links
 

1978 births
Living people
Olympic archers of Bhutan
Archers at the 2004 Summer Olympics
Archers at the 2008 Summer Olympics
Bhutanese male archers
Archers at the 1998 Asian Games
Archers at the 2002 Asian Games
Archers at the 2006 Asian Games
Archers at the 2018 Asian Games
Asian Games competitors for Bhutan